Tomboy is a free and open-source desktop notetaking app written for Windows, macOS, Linux, and BSD operating systems. Tomboy is part of the GNOME desktop environment. As Ubuntu changed over time and its cloud synchronization software Ubuntu One came and went, Tomboy inspired various forks and clones. Its interface is a word processor with a wiki-like linking system to connect notes together. Words in the note body that match existing note titles become hyperlinks automatically, making it simple to construct a personal wiki. For example, repeated references to favorite artists would be automatically highlighted in notes containing their names. As of version 1.6 (2010), it supports text entries and hyperlinks to the World Wide Web, but not graphic image linking or embedding.

Development of the original Tomboy software ceased in 2017.  Starting in 2017 the development team rewrote the software from scratch, for ease of maintenance and installation, renaming it tomboy-ng.  Tomboy-ng is written in Free Pascal.

Features

Some of the editing features supported:
 Text highlighting
 Inline spell checking using GtkSpell
 Automatic hyperlinking of Web and email addresses
 Undo/redo
 Font styling and sizing
 Bulleted lists
 Note synchronization over SSH, WebDAV, Ubuntu One, or the Tomboy REST API that is implemented by several server applications

Plugins
Tomboy supports several plugins, including:
 Evolution mail links
 Galago/Pidgin presence
 Note of the day (disabled by default)
 Fixed width text
 HTML export
 LaTeX math (in the package , not installed by default)
 Print

Ports
 Conboy: a Tomboy port to the Maemo platform written in the C language
 Gnote: a conversion of the Tomboy code to the C++ language, but is not cross-platform
 libktomgirl: a platform-independent library that reads and writes the Tomboy File Format 
 Tomdroid: an effort to produce a Tomboy-compatbile notetaking app for the Android operating system.

See also

 Comparison of notetaking software

References

External links

 

Software that uses Mono (software)
Free note-taking software
Cross-platform free software
Free software programmed in C Sharp
GNOME Applications
Note-taking software that uses GTK
Personal wikis